USNS Eagleview (T-AGSE-3) is a submarine support vessel acquired by the U.S. Navy in 2015 and assigned to Military Sealift Command.

Construction
Eagleview was built in 2009 by Leevec Industries, Jennings, Louisiana, for Hornbeck Offshore.

External link
 USNS Eagleview (T-AGSE-3)

See also
 List of Military Sealift Command ships
 

Auxiliary ships of the United States Navy
2009 ships
Black Powder-class submarine and special warfare support vessels